Lawrence "Larry" N. Hansen (December 23, 1940 – November 15, 2010), born to Jeanne and Stanley D. Hansen, was a Vice-President of the Joyce Foundation. He grew up in Elgin, Illinois, graduated in 1963 from the University of Illinois at Urbana-Champaign, and married in 1969. He had a long history of public service and politics including work done for Lawyer’s Committee for Civil Rights, Freedom Democratic Party, Roosevelt Center for Policy Studies as well as internship in the Illinois House of Representatives. He was also a member of the National Council for Media and Public Affairs at George Washington University, the Chicago Council on Foreign Relations and the Chicago Historical Society. He also worked for Democratic politicians including Senator Adlai E. Stevenson, III and former Vice-President and presidential candidate Walter Mondale. He died in his River Forest, Illinois home after a yearlong struggle with lung cancer and was survived by his mother and three siblings, and by his wife of 41 years Margaret "Marge" (Rybicki) Hansen.

References

1940 births
2010 deaths
People from Chicago
University of Illinois Urbana-Champaign alumni
Deaths from cancer in Illinois
People from River Forest, Illinois